Dardan Vuthaj (born 30 September 1995) is an Albanian footballer who plays as a forward for Italian  club Novara on loan from Foggia.

Club career

Early career
Vuthaj started his career as part of the Genoa youth academy. He was loaned out to Savona in the summer of 2012 in order to gain more experience, and he made his senior debut with the club in the Lega Pro Seconda Divisione on 11 November 2012 against Castiglione, coming on as a 75th-minute substitute for Ignazio Carta in the 2–1 loss. He made two appearances for the Savona first team during the 2012–13 campaign as they went on to finish second and earn promotion to the Lega Pro Prima Divisione, and he also played for the club's youth team, scoring 9 goals in 12 games during his loan spell. He returned to the Genoa Primavera side where he spent the first half of the 2013–14 season before joining Serie D side  Chiavari Calcio Caperana in January 2014, where he made 11 appearances and also scored his first senior career goal before leaving the club at the end of the season. Vuthaj joined another Serie D side AC Bra on 7 November 2014 as a free agent, making 7 appearances and scoring once during his short spell with the club, as he left to join fellow Serie D side San Donato in December 2014. Vuthaj featured in 14 games and scored once for San Donato during the second half of the campaign before leaving the club at the end of the season.

KF Laçi
After spending his entire youth and senior career in Italy, Vuthaj moved to Albania, the country of his parents' birth, to join Albanian Superliga side KF Laci.

Imolese
On 15 July 2019, he joined Serie C club Imolese on a one-year contract with an option to extend it for another year.

Novara
He played the 2021–22 season with Serie D club Novara, which he led to promotion to Serie C scoring 35 goals in 35 games, making him the most prolific football player in the Italian top four leagues.

Foggia
On 1 September 2022, Vuthaj signed a two-year contract with Foggia. On 26 January 2023, he returned to Novara on loan.

International carrer
Vuthaj was a young international for Albania.

Personal life
Vuthaj was born in Patras, Greece to Albanian parents, then moving to Liguria as a kid with his family.

Career statistics

Club

References

External links

1995 births
Living people
Footballers from Patras
Albanian footballers
Association football forwards
Serie C players
Lega Pro Seconda Divisione players
Serie D players
Genoa C.F.C. players
Savona F.B.C. players
A.C. Bra players
S.S. Monopoli 1966 players
Imolese Calcio 1919 players
Rimini F.C. 1912 players
KF Laçi players
Novara F.C. players
Calcio Foggia 1920 players
Kategoria Superiore players
Albanian expatriate footballers
Albanian expatriate sportspeople in Italy
Expatriate footballers in Italy
Albania youth international footballers